This is a list of hospitals in Finland. The majority of the healthcare in Finland is offered by public service providers. The private sector is very small. Primary health care is offered in municipal health centers, whose services include physical examinations, oral health, medical care, ambulance services, maternity and child health clinics, school and student health care and other basic services. Specialized medical care, including outpatient and institutional treatment is provided by hospital districts. Diseases requiring highly demanding treatment are handled by regional arrangements or centrally according to a specific decree.

University Hospitals
Each hospital district contains a central hospital and other specialised units. There are five university hospitals.

Helsinki University Hospital, Helsinki
Tampere University Hospital, Tampere
Kuopio University Hospital, Kuopio
Turku University Hospital, Turku
Oulu University Hospital, Oulu

Central Hospitals

Kymenlaakso Central Hospital, Kotka
South Karelia Central Hospital, Lappeenranta
Päijänne Tavastia Central Hospital, Lahti
Central Hospital of Tavastia, Hämeenlinna
Satakunta Central Hospital, Pori
Vaasa Central Hospital, Vaasa
Southern Ostrobothnia Central Hospital, Seinäjoki
Central Hospital of Keski-Pohjanmaa, Kokkola
Central Finland Central Hospital, Jyväskylä
Mikkeli Central Hospital, Mikkeli
Central Hospital of Savonlinna, Savonlinna
North Karelia Central Hospital, Joensuu
Lapland Central Hospital, Rovaniemi
Central Hospital of Kainuu, Kajaani
Åland Central Hospital, Mariehamn, Åland
Central Hospital of Länsi-Pohja, Kemi

Regional Hospitals

Helsinki and Uusimaa Hospital District
Helsinki

Espoo and Vantaa	
Jorvi Hospital 	
Peijas Hospital

Hospitals in the other municipalities

Hospital District of Southwest Finland
Halikko Hospital, Halikko
Loimaa Regional Hospital, Loimaa
Salo Regional Hospital, Salo
Vakka-Suomi Hospital, Uusikaupunki
Åboland/Turunmaa Hospital, Turku

Hospital District of South Karelia
Parikkala Regional Hospital, Parikkala
Armila Hospital, Lappeenranta
Honkaharju Hospital, Imatra

Hospital District of Päijänne-Tavastia
Kuusankoski Hospital, Kuusankoski

Kymenlaakso Hospital District
Kuusankoski Regional Hospital, Kouvola

Tavastia Hospital District
Riihimäki Regional Hospital, Riihimäki
Forssa Regional Hospital, Forssa

Satakunta Hospital District
Harjavalta Hospital, Harjavalta
Rauma Regional Hospital, Rauma
Satalinna Hospital, Harjavalta

Vaasa Hospital District
Bottenhavet Hospital, Kristinestad

Etelä-Pohjanmaa Hospital District
Ähtäri Regional Hospital, Ähtäri

Central Finland Health Care District
Kinkomaa Hospital, Jyväskylä
Sädesairaala Hospital, Jyväskylä
Juurikkaniemi Hospital, Keuruu
Kangasvuori Hospital, Jyväskylä

Pirkanmaa Hospital District
Kaivanto Hospital, Kangasala
Mänttä Hospital, Mänttä
Pitkäniemi Hospital, Nokia
Vammala Regional Hospital, Sastamala
Valkeakosken Regional Hospital, Valkeakoski

Etelä-Savo Hospital District
Moisio Hospital, Mikkeli
Pieksämäki Regional Hospital, Pieksämäki

North Karelia Hospital District
Kotilahti Hospital, Joensuu

Hospital District of Northern Savonia
Julkula Hospital, Kuopio
Alava Hospital, Kuopio
Tarina Hospital, Siilinjärvi
Iisalmi Regional Hospital, Iisalmi

Northern Ostrobothnia Hospital District
Oulaskangas Hospital, Oulainen
Visala Hospital, Ylivieska

Lapland Hospital District
Muurola Hospital, Rovaniemi

Länsi-Pohja Hospital District
Keropudas Hospital, Tornio

Hospital District of Åland
Grelsby sjukhus, Finström, Åland

Private Hospitals

Eira Hospital, Helsinki
Diacor, Helsinki
Docrates Cancer Center, Helsinki
Pohjola Hospital (Orthopedics), Helsinki, Kuopio, Tampere, Turku, Oulu
Pulssi, Turku
 Dextra, Helsinki
 Helsinki Hospital, Helsinki
, Klinika Helena, Savonlinna

References

External links
Hospital District 2011 Statistics Finland.

Finland
 List
Hospitals
Finland